Brunnadern-Neckertal railway station is a railway station in Brunnadern, in the Swiss canton of St. Gallen. It is an intermediate station on the Bodensee–Toggenburg railway and is served by local trains only.

Services 
Brunnadern-Neckertal is served by two services of the St. Gallen S-Bahn:

 : hourly service over the Bodensee–Toggenburg railway between Nesslau-Neu St. Johann and Altstätten SG.
 : hourly service over the Bodensee–Toggenburg railway via Sargans (circular operation).

References

External links 
 
 Brunnadern-Neckertal station on SBB

Railway stations in the canton of St. Gallen
Südostbahn stations